Woodford Halse is a village about  south of Daventry in Northamptonshire. It is in the civil parish of Woodford cum Membris , which includes also village of Hinton and hamlet of West Farndon. Hinton and Woodford Halse are separated by the infant River Cherwell and the former course of the Great Central Main Line railway.

Churches
The earliest parts of the Church of England parish church of Saint Mary the Virgin include the chancel, west tower and south doorway, which date from about 1300. The arcade of the south aisle is 14th or 15th century.

St Mary's has a ring of six bells plus a sanctus bell. One of the Watts family of bell-founders, who had foundries in Bedford and Leicester, cast four of the bells including the tenor in 1613. John Taylor & Co of Loughborough cast a fifth in 1909 and the present treble in 1976.

St. Mary's parish is a member of the Benefice of Woodford Halse with Eydon, Byfield, Northamptonshire, Aston Le Walls and Boddington, Northamptonshire.

Woodford Halse has also a Moravian Church.

Economic history

A flight of four lynchets survive south of the village: a rare survival in Northamptonshire. In 1758 the open field system of farming around Woodford Halse was ended by enclosure. The ridge and furrow pattern of the common fields is visible in parts of the parish, and especially just south of the village. Allotments northeast of the village are laid out along the ridges and furrows, and follow their uneven widths and reverse S-curve.

In 1848 Woodford Halse's principal landowners included Sir Henry E.L. Dryden, 7th Baronet and Sir Charles Knightley, 2nd Baronet.

In July 1873 the East and West Junction Railway (later part of the Stratford-upon-Avon and Midland Junction Railway) was opened through the parish.

The GCR established a new station called Woodford & Hinton, a four-way railway junction, a major locomotive depot and extensive marshalling yards. A plan to build carriage sheds here was not implemented, but between the old village and the new railway several rows of terraced houses for railway workers were built, together with a street of shops.

The Railway Hotel was built in 1900. By 1973 it had become Woodford Halse Social Club.

The parish's population eventually peaked at just under 2,000, at which time the village had its own cinema. The GCR main line was at times a busy route and the depot and yards at Woodford Halse were very active.

British Railways renamed the station Woodford Halse on 1 November 1948. Following the 1963 The Reshaping of British Railways report, BR closed the station, the main line and the Banbury branch of the former GCR on 5 September 1966. All tracks and most railway buildings were dismantled. The population fell sharply as former railway workers left the parish, but new developments in later decades have since increased it. Where the GCR's line, depot and yards were sited is now a tree plantation which was acquired by the Parish Council in 2016 as a public amenity space and a small modern industrial estate, but evidence of the railway is still visible.

Currently, public transport serving Woodford Halse consists of an hourly bus between Banbury and Daventry, operated by Stagecoach Oxfordshire.

Amenities

Woodford Halse Church of England Primary School serves the parish. The school has one of the largest playing fields of any Northamptonshire school and holds an annual cross-country race, attracting over 700 competitors from more than thirty schools. The village has several shops and businesses. Northamptonshire Fire and Rescue Service has a fire station at Woodford Halse, staffed by retained firefighters. The village's regular social events include the Annual Christmas Street Fair and Summer Boat Races.

Sport and leisure
Woodford Halse has a non-League football club, Woodford United F.C., which plays at Byfield Road.

References

Sources and further reading

External links

 Woodford cum Membris

Villages in Northamptonshire
West Northamptonshire District